The Teltow and Magdeburg Wars were fought between 1239 and 1245 over possession of Barnim and Teltow in the present-day federal German state of Brandenburg. They took place in the 13th century during the course of the Eastern German Expansion. The opposing sides during the armed conflict, which took place on two fronts simultaneously, were:
 The Margraviate of Brandenburg, led by the Ascanian rulers John I, Margrave of Brandenburg and Otto III, Margrave of Brandenburg.
 The Margravate of Meissen, led by Henry III, Margrave of Meissen of the House of Wettin, and Wilbrand von Käfernburg, the then-Archbishop of Magdeburg.
At the time the Ascanians were expanding Cölln as trade centre and economic competitor to the House of Wettin's Köpenick, which laid the foundations for Berlin's subsequent economic and political domination of the area. After Ascanian victory in 1245 the Barnim and Teltow plateaus remained as part of the Margraviate of Brandenburg and the subsequent Prussian Province of Brandenburg well beyond the unification of Germany in 1871. Since 1920 huge parts of the plateaus form part of Greater Berlin, itself no part of Brandenburg any more, but a city-state within Germany, whereas the parts of the plateaus further away from Berlin city centre form now parts of the present districts Barnim and Teltow-Fläming in the State of Brandenburg.

External links 
  Marca Brandenburgensis: John I and Otto III
  Marca Brandenburgensis: Battles and Campaigns in the Margraviate of Brandenburg around 1260 
  Willbrand von Käfenburg

Further reading 
  Reinhard E. Fischer: Die Ortsnamen der Länder Brandenburg und Berlin in Brandenburgische Historische Kommission, Brandenburgischen Historischen Studien, Volume 13 (Berlin: be.bra wissenschaft, 2005), .
  Michas, Uwe: Die Eroberung und Besiedlungs Nordbrandenburgs, Gesellschaft zuer Erforschung und Förderung der märkischen Eiszeitstraße, Entdeckungen entlang der Märkischen Eiszeitstraße (Eberswalde, 2003), .
  Schich, Winfried: Das mittelalterliche Berlin (1237-1411) in Ribbe, Wolfgang (ed.): Veröffentlichung der Historischen Kommission zu Berlin, Geschichte Berlins, Volume 1 (Munich: C.H. Beck, 1987), .
  Sello, Georg: Der Erwerb des Teltow und Barnim durch die Markgrafen Johann I Otto III., in: Forschungen zur brandenburgisch-preußischen Geschichte 5, 1892
  Sello, Georg: Die halberstädter-brandenburgische Fehde 1238–1245, in: Zeitschrift des Harzvereins für Geschichte und Altertumskunde, Volume 24 (1891), pp. 201–219

References 

13th century in the Holy Roman Empire
History of Brandenburg
Wars involving Germany